Carl Robert Olof Gustafsson (born 20 December 1964) is a Swedish comedian, actor, and member of Killinggänget. He has sometimes been called "the funniest man in Sweden".

Style of comedy
While Killinggänget is mostly known for its use of irony and pop-culture references, Gustafsson usually employs a more traditional and physical style of comedy, such as slapstick and playing characters with highly exaggerated personalities. He is well known for his range of voices and accents, and his tendency to play people who end up hurting themselves. This style is a lot more pronounced when he is working solo or with other people outside Killinggänget.

Some of the roles that Robert has portrayed include:

Greger: An obviously homosexual fireman dressed in a plaid kilt.
Various old people: Gustafsson is known for portraying old and often rather senile individuals.
Bertil: An accident-prone gardener who has his own TV show Lost in my own garden. This role was inspired by a 1980s Swedish gardening show where the host accidentally cut his thumb with a knife, but kept going as if nothing had happened. (The Julia Child spoof by Dan Aykroyd might have been an inspiration as well.) This role led to some of Gustafsson's more gory comedy.

In addition, Gustafsson is a skilled imitator and his many famous imitations include Ingmar Bergman, Sven Wollter, Ernst-Hugo Järegård, Tony Rickardsson, Robert Aschberg and Magnus Härenstam as well as former Prime Ministers Göran Persson and Carl Bildt.

Fame
Gustafsson is one of Sweden's most famous and beloved comedians, having appeared in many TV shows and films. He has also appeared on Norwegian television, in the show Åpen Post. Besides his iconic work with Killinggänget he has been a cornerstone of Swedish entertainment for many years. He has played in sitcoms such as Rena rama Rolf, and been a regular guest on comedy shows such as Gäster med gester and Parlamentet, a popular panel show similar to BBC's If I Ruled the World.

Selected filmography
2021 -  As Stig Engström in The Unlikely Murderer (Den Osannolika Mördaren)
2018 -  "The Truth Will Out" Television Series (Peter Wendel), 1 Season, 8 episodes, Det som göms i snö (2018) 
2016 - The 101-Year-Old Man Who Skipped Out on the Bill and Disappeared
2013 - The Hundred-Year-Old Man Who Climbed Out of the Window and Disappeared (Allan Karlsson)
2009 - Ice Age: Dawn of the Dinosaurs (Swedish dubbing, Sid)
2007 - Hjälp!
2006 - Jul i Tøyengata - Tvnorge's julekalender
2006 - Ice Age: The Meltdown (Swedish dubbing, Sid)
2005 - En decemberdröm - SVT's Julkalendern 2005
2005 - Robotar (Robots) (Swedish dubbing, Fender)
2004 - Four Shades of Brown (Fyra nyanser av brunt )
2003 - Skenbart – en film om tåg
2002 - Ice Age (Swedish dubbing, Sid)
2001 - Monsters, Inc. (Swedish dubbing, Mike Wazowski)
1999 - Fyra små filmer; Screwed in Tallinn (Torsk på Tallinn)
1997 - Lilla Jönssonligan på styva linan
1996 - Att stjäla en tjuv
1995 - Alfred
1994 - Lust
1993 - Sune's Summer
1993 - Drömkåken
1991 - Underjordens hemlighet
1985 - Skrotnisse och hans vänner (voice)

In 2004, his performance in Four Shades of Brown earned him a Guldbagge Award for Best Actor in a Leading Role.

Racism controversy
In February 2014, the satirical programme SNN News showed a sketch where Gustavsson played a "Representative of the Sámi", an indigenous people of Sweden. The sketch was widely accused of racism against Sámi people, both in Swedish media and abroad in Norway, where most of the Sámi people live. More than fifty individual viewers have filed complaints about the sketch to the Swedish Broadcasting Commission. pr

References

External links

Official homepage

1964 births
Living people
Swedish male television actors
Swedish male voice actors
Swedish male comedians
Best Actor Guldbagge Award winners
Swedish male film actors
20th-century Swedish comedians
21st-century Swedish comedians
Melodifestivalen contestants of 2018